Amanda Grace Sudano Ramirez (born August 11, 1982) is an American singer-songwriter and model. She is a member of the musical duo Johnnyswim.

Early life 
Sudano was born in Los Angeles, California, to singer Donna Summer and songwriter Bruce Sudano. She has two older sisters, Mimi Sommer Dohler, from her mother's first marriage to actor Helmut Sommer, and actress Brooklyn Sudano. Her maternal cousin is the music producer and rapper Omega Red, and her paternal uncle is Fr. Glenn Sudano, CFR, a Roman Catholic priest and founding member of the Franciscan Friars of the Renewal in New York City.

Sudano spent the early part of her childhood in Thousand Oaks, California. In 1995, when she was 13, her family moved to Nashville, Tennessee, where she attended high school at Christ Presbyterian Academy and college at Vanderbilt University.

Modeling career
Sudano is a model with the Bella Agency in New York.

In 2010, Fabrizio Viti chose Sudano to model for Louis Vuitton's Spring/Summer 2010 shoe campaign. Sudano is the first black model to be featured solely in Louis Vuitton advertisements.

In September 2011, Sudano placed second out of twenty in Vogue'''s "Special Edition Best Dressed" feature.

Music career
In 2005, Sudano met songwriter, guitarist and vocalist Abner Ramirez in Nashville. They struck up a friendship and formed the band Johnnyswim. The duo have performed covers of eclectic songs like Edith Piaf's "La Vie En Rose" and Britney Spears's "Till The World Ends", as well as originals like "Home", the theme song to the hit HGTV show Fixer Upper. Johnnyswim released their first self-titled EP in 2008. A second EP, 5-8, arrived in 2010. This was followed by the singles Bonsoir and Good News in 2011, a third EP called Home, Vol. 1 in 2012, and  four studio albums: Diamonds (2014), Georgica Pond (2016), Moonlight (2019), and Johnnyswim (2022).

Personal life
In 2009, Sudano married her Johnnyswim bandmate Abner Ramirez in Florida. Her father, Bruce Sudano, paid tribute to her in the song "The Amazing Amanda Grace" on his award-winning record Life and the Romantic. Footage from her wedding was featured in the video for another track from the same record, "It's Her Wedding Day", which was actually written about her sister Brooklyn's marriage in 2006.

Sudano lives with her husband in Los Angeles, California and gave birth to a son, Joaquin, in February 2015. In 2018, she gave birth to a daughter, Luna. In November 2019, the couple announced on social media that Amanda had given birth to a second daughter named Paloma. As of 2021, Sudano and her family are the stars of two Magnolia Network television shows: Home on the Road with Johnnyswim and The Johnnyswim Show''.

References

External links
 Johnnyswim website
 Amanda Sudano @ Bella Agency
 Interview (2010)

1982 births
African-American women singers
African-American women singer-songwriters
American female models
American people of Italian descent
American women pop singers
American rhythm and blues singer-songwriters
American soul singers
African-American Christians
Donna Summer
Living people
Singer-songwriters from Tennessee
Singer-songwriters from California
Spanish-language singers of the United States
21st-century American women singers
21st-century American singers